Palur (also Romanized as Pālūr) is a village in Jaghin-e Jonubi Rural District, Jaghin District, Rudan County, Hormozgan Province, Iran. At the 2006 census, its population was 1,017, in 202 families.

References 

Populated places in Rudan County